Tibors de Sarenom (French Tiburge; c. 1130 – aft. 1198) is the earliest attestable trobairitz, active during the classical period of medieval Occitan literature at the height of the popularity of the troubadours.

Biography

Tibors is one of eight trobairitz with vidas, short Occitan biographies, often more hypothetical than factual. Research into Tibors' the poet's identification with an independently recorded individual is hampered by the popularity of her name in Occitania during the period of her life.

Tibors was the daughter of Guilhem d'Omelas and Tibors d'Aurenga, who brought her husband the castle of Sarenom, probably Sérignan-du-Comtat in Provence or perhaps Sérignan in the Roussillon. Sadly for historians and Occitanists, Tibors and Guilhem had two daughters, both named Tibors, after their mother. It is possible but unlikely that Tibors d'Aurenga was herself the trobairitz. Since she was married in 1129 or 1130 and her daughters were married by 1150, it is unlikely they were born long after.

Raimbaut d'Orange, the famous troubadour, was a younger of son of Guilhem and Tibors and thus a younger brother of the two Tibors sisters. In 1150 the elder Tibors died and by her will left Raimbaut, then a minor, under the guardianship of her elder daughter and her son-in-law, the trobairitz' second husband, Bertran dels Baus. The younger sister, Tiburgette, was the recipient of a wedding gift from their father in that year (1150). In the will of her father, Guilhem, Tibors is referred to as autre Tiburge (the other Tibors), while her younger sister is given pre-eminence.

By 1150 (or 1155 if the dating of Tibors d'Aurenga's will is incorrect), Goufroy de Mornas, Tibors' first husband, had already died. She had no recorded children by him, but with Bertrand she had three sons: Uc, father of Barral of Marseille; Bertran, father of Raimon; and Guilhem, also a troubadour.

Tibors is said to have died soon after her husband (1180) in 1181 or 1182, but a document of her son Uc dated 13 August 1198 refers to "the advice of his mother Tibors".

Poetry
Of Tibors' work only a single stanza of a canso with its attached vida and razo has survived. Nonetheless, she is mentioned in an anonymous ballad dated to between 1220 and 1245, where she acts as the judge of a game of poetry. Her only work goes like this:

Sources

Bogin, Meg (1976). The Women Troubadours. Scarborough: Paddington. .
Bruckner, M. T.; Shepard, L.; and White, S. (1995). Songs of the Women Troubadours. New York: Garland Publishing. .
Egan, Margarita (1984). The Vidas of the Troubadours. New York: Garland Publishing. .
Schutz, Alexander Herman (1972 [1950]). Biographies des troubadours. Ayer Publishing. .

External links
Tiburge d'Orange at the Medieval Lands Project.

Notes

Trobairitz
12th-century French troubadours
Medieval French women musicians
Year of birth uncertain
1198 deaths